Tuomas Ollila (born 25 April 2000) is a Finnish professional footballer who plays for Veikkausliiga club HJK Helsinki and the Finland national football team.

Club career

Ilves Tampere
On 1 January 2021, he moved from FC KTP to Veikkausliiga club Ilves as his contract with FC KTP had expired.

HJK Helsinki
Ollila transferred from Ilves to HJK Helsinki on 3 January 2023.  He made his debut and scored his first goal on 27 January in a 3–0 cup win against IFK Mariehamn.

International career
Ollila was first invited to Finland in November 2022 to prepare for Norway and North Macedonia.  He made his debut against North Macedonia on 17 November.

Personal life
Ollila has two brothers who are also football players, Juuso Ollila and Akseli Ollila, both of whom play for MPS/Atletico Malmi.

Career statistics

Club

International

References

External links
 Footballdatabase Profile

2000 births
Living people
Finnish footballers
Association football defenders
Klubi 04 players
Kotkan Työväen Palloilijat players
FC Ilves players
Ykkönen players
Veikkausliiga players
Kakkonen players